Aleksandar Batinkov (born 4 December 1985) is a Bulgarian male artistic gymnast, representing his nation at international competitions.  He participated at the 2015 European Games in Baku. He also competed at world championships, including the 2007 World Artistic Gymnastics Championships in Stuttgart, Germany.

References

Further reading 
 Bulgaria's Aleksandar Batinkov performs during the parallel bars competition
 The Varna World Challenge Cup
 Worlds Hosts Get Ready with Glasgow Grand Prix
 

Bulgarian male artistic gymnasts
Gymnasts at the 2015 European Games
European Games competitors for Bulgaria
1985 births
Living people
Place of birth missing (living people)